The 2FM Song Contest, known for sponsorship reasons as The Jacobs/2FM Song Contest or 2fm/Perri Song Contest was an annual song writing competition for young people in Ireland. Created by producer/presenter Kevin Hough, it was run by national broadcaster RTÉ 2fm from 1982 to 2017.

Legacy
Winners included Naimee Coleman, Elaine Hearty, Laura Izibor, Sarah Packiam, RuthAnne, Dave Geraghty and 2008 Karaoke World Championships runner-up Elaine O'Halloran.  Damien Dempsey was once a runner-up in the competition, and other contestants have included 21 Demands (Kodaline). The 2005 winner won €8,000 of musical equipment.

Laura Izibor's, winning song "Compatible", received constant airplay after she won the competition and RTÉ filmed a documentary of Izibor after winning the competition.

References

Songwriting competitions
Competitions in Ireland
1982 establishments in Ireland
2017 disestablishments in Ireland
RTÉ 2fm